Huangpu Road Station serves as an interchange station of Line 1 and Line 8 of the Wuhan Metro . It entered revenue service along with the completion of Line 1, Phase 1 on July 28, 2004. The Line 8 platforms were opened on 26 December 2017. The station situates at the intersection of Jinghan Avenue and Lugouqiao Road. Before Phase 2, Huangpu Road Station was the northernmost terminus on Line 1. A single crossover was installed just south of the station to accommodate for trains entering terminus prior to 2010. The underground platforms for Line 8 has not been built yet.

Station layout

Facilities
Huangpu Road Station for Line 1 is a two-story elevated station erected at the northern end of Jinghan Avenue. The station has two side platforms accommodating a pair of tracks, with a single crossover at the southern end of the station. The station is equipped with attended customer service concierges, automatic ticket vending machines, and accessible ramps.

Exits
There are currently eight exits in service:
 Exit A
 Exit C
 Exit D
 Exit E
 Exit F
 Exit G
 Exit H
 Exit J

Transfers
Bus transfers to Route 30, 60, 212, 402, 520, 526, 548, 583, 588, 606, 707, 721 and 727 are available at Huangpu Road Station.

References

Wuhan Metro stations
Line 1, Wuhan Metro
Line 8, Wuhan Metro
Railway stations in China opened in 2004